The following lists events that happened in 1960 in Libya.

Incumbents
Monarch: Idris 
Prime Minister: Abdul Majid Kubar (until October 17), Muhammad Osman Said (starting October 17)

Events
 Libyan general election, 1960

 
Years of the 20th century in Libya
Libya
Libya
1960s in Libya